"Crazy He Calls Me" is a 1949 jazz standard. It was composed by Carl Sigman, with lyrics by Bob Russell.

Notable recordings
American jazz singer Billie Holiday recorded it. Other artists to record the song include Dinah Washington (with Clifford Brown), Natalie Cole, Anita O'Day, Claire Martin, Linda Ronstadt, Dakota Staton, Marlena Studer and Aretha Franklin. As "Crazy She Calls Me", it has also been recorded by Nat King Cole, Tony Bennett, Sam Cooke, and Rod Stewart.

See also
List of jazz standards

References

External links
 

1940s jazz standards
1949 songs
Songs written by Carl Sigman
Songs with lyrics by Bob Russell (songwriter)